The 4th Field Artillery Regiment is a Field Artillery Branch regiment of the United States Army first formed in 1907.

History

The 4th Field Artillery Regiment was first activated in 1907 from numbered companies of artillery. It was first organized with two battalions.

Distinctive unit insignia
 Description
A silver color metal and shield device 1 1/4 inches (3.18 cm) in height on which is the Aztec symbol of a red sun surmounted by a silver kris and kampilan saltirewise, the red sun within yellow rays, the shield edged with a red border. 
 Symbolism
The crossed kris and kampilan are significant of the service of batteries of the regiment in the Philippines. The Aztec symbol of the sun refers to the service of batteries of the regiment with the Punitive Expeditions in Mexico. 
Background
The distinctive unit insignia was originally approved for the 4th Field Artillery Regiment on 29 September 1923. It was redesignated for the 4th Field Artillery Battalion on 9 August 1941. It was canceled on 21 April 1959. The insignia was reinstated and redesignated for the 4th Field Artillery Regiment effective 1 September 1971.

Coat of arms
Blazon
Shield: Gules, a bend sinister Or. 
Crest: On a wreath of the colors Or and Gules two kampilans in saltire Argent, hilted Or charged with a crescent Gules a rattlesnake with four rattles entwined with the weapons Proper.  
 Motto: The motto translated “No Step Backward” alludes to the sure-footedness of the mule in mountains, as well as being a good maxim for soldiers.
 Symbolism
 Shield: The shield is scarlet for Artillery. The bend sinister, an allusion to the hybrid mule, is indicative of the regiment’s former service as pack artillery. 
 Crest: The rattlesnake, a device on the arms of Mexico, refers to the Punitive Expeditions into Mexico. The kampilan and crescent commemorate the services of the regiment against the Moros and in Vera Cruz. 
 Background: The coat of arms was originally approved for the 4th Field Artillery Regiment on 29 January 1921. It was redesignated for the 4th Field Artillery Battalion on 22 August 1941. It was cancelled on 21 April 1959. The insignia was reinstated and redesignated for the 4th Field Artillery Regiment effective 1 September 1971.

See also
 4th Air Defense Artillery Regiment - had shared lineage 1 September 1958 – 1 September 1971

References

 https://web.archive.org/web/20120616120758/http://www.tioh.hqda.pentagon.mil/Heraldry/ArmyDUISSICOA/ArmyHeraldryUnit.aspx?u=3410

External links
 http://www.history.army.mil/html/forcestruc/lineages/branches/fa/default.htm 

004
F 004
004
004